Oceanimonas baumannii is a Gram-negative and motile bacterium from the genus of Oceanimonas which has been isolated from estuarine mud from the River Wear in England.

References

Further reading 
 

Aeromonadales
Bacteria described in 2001